National Highway 147E, commonly referred to as NH 147E is a national highway in India. It is a spur road of National Highway 47.  NH-147E traverses the state of Madhya Pradesh in India.

Route 
NH 147E connects Jhabua (Bypass) - Nawagaon - Raipuriya.

Junctions  

  Terminal near Jhabua.

See also 
 List of National Highways in India
 List of National Highways in India by state

References

External links 

 NH 147E on OpenStreetMap

National highways in India
National Highways in Madhya Pradesh